Margaret Fredkulla (Swedish: Margareta Fredkulla; Danish: Margrete Fredkulla; Norwegian: Margret Fredskolla; 1080s – 4 November 1130) was a Swedish princess who became successively queen of Norway and Denmark by marriage to kings Magnus III of Norway and Niels of Denmark. She was also de facto regent of Denmark. An English exonym is Margaret Colleen-of-Peace.

Biography 
Margaret was born a princess as one of four children of King Inge the Elder of Sweden and Queen Helena. The exact year of birth and place of birth is not recorded.

Queen of Norway
In 1101, she was married to King Magnus of Norway. The marriage had been arranged as a part of the peace treaty between Sweden and Norway. She was often referred to as Margaret Fredkulla (Margaret the Maiden of Peace). She brought with her large fiefs and areas in Sweden as her dowry, probably in Västergötland.  In 1103, she was made widow after two years of marriage, and soon left Norway. The marriage was childless. Her departure from Norway was seen as an insult by the Norwegians who expected her to stay, and she was accused of having stolen the holy relics of Saint Olav.

Queen of Denmark
In 1105, she married King Niels of Denmark. Niels was made king in 1104, but he was described as a passive monarch who lacked the capacity to rule and who left the affairs of the state to his queen. With his blessing, Margaret governed Denmark. She is described as a wise ruler, and the relationship between Denmark and her birth country Sweden was very peaceful during her time as queen. It was said that: Styrelsen beroede for størstedelen paa den ædle dronning Margrete, saa at fremmede sagde, at Danmarks styrelse laa i kvindehaand ("The rule was so much dependent on the noble Queen Margaret, that foreigners remarked that the rule of Denmark lay in a woman's hand"). She minted her own coins, something unique for a queen consort of this time. The Danish coins printed during this period bears the inscription: Margareta-Nicalas ("Margaret-Niels").

Her father, king Inge the Elder, died in 1110, and was succeeded on the Swedish throne by his nephews. Her elder sister, Christina, lived in Russia, and was in Sweden counted as too far away to be given a share in the inheritance of their father, leaving only Margaret and her younger sister Catherine among the sisters as heirs. It is known that Margaret shared her inheritance with her niece Ingrid in Norway, and her niece Ingeborg in Denmark, giving each one-fourth.

In 1114, Margaret was sent a letter by Theobald of Étampes (Theobaldus Stampensis) thanking her for a liberality to the Church of Caen.

Death
After her death in 1130, King Niels married Queen dowager Ulvhild of Sweden. Margaret's lands in Sweden became a base for her son, Magnus when he claimed the throne of Sweden through her. When Margaret's first cousin King Inge the Younger died, Magnus claimed the throne as the eldest grandson of King Inge the Elder and reigned as King Magnus I of Sweden.

Issue
Queen Margaret had two children with King Niels:
 Inge Nielsen (died as a child)
 Magnus I of Sweden (born about 1106)

References

Other sources
 Harrison, Dick  Gud vill det – Nordiska korsfarare under medeltiden (2005)
 Nanna Damsholt Kvindebilledet i dansk højmiddelalder (1985)

External links
 Margareta Fredkulla

	

Norwegian royal consorts
Danish royal consorts
Regents of Denmark
1080s births
1130 deaths
Margaret 1080
11th-century Danish people
11th-century Danish women
11th-century Swedish people
11th-century Swedish women
11th-century Norwegian people
11th-century Norwegian women
12th-century Danish people
12th-century Danish women
12th-century Swedish people
12th-century Swedish women
12th-century Norwegian people
12th-century Norwegian women
Remarried royal consorts
Daughters of kings